Tatiyah is a village in northern Aleppo Governorate, northwestern Syria.

The village administratively belongs to Nahiya Azaz in Azaz District. Nearby localities include Nayarah  to the south and Salamah  to the west.

Demographics
In the 2004 census, Tatiyah had a population of 76.

In late 19th century, traveler Martin Hartmann noted Tatiyah as a Bedouin village of 7 households.

References

Populated places in Aleppo Governorate